Lalun may refer to:

 Lalun, a thoroughbred racehorse and broodmare who won the 1955 Kentucky Oaks
 Lalun, Iran, a village near Tehran, Iran
 Lalun, Philippines, a populated place in Ilocos Norte
 Lalun Formation, a stratigraphic formation in the early Cambrian Sauk sequence